The following is a list of awards and nominations received by American actress and comedian Kathy Bates. She is the recipient of numerous accolades, including an Academy Award, two Golden Globe Awards, two Screen Actors Guild Awards, and two Primetime Emmy Awards.

Major associations

Academy Awards

British Academy Film Awards

Primetime Emmy Awards

Golden Globe Awards

Screen Actors Guild Awards

Tony Awards

Other awards and nominations

American Comedy Awards

Blockbuster Entertainment Awards

CableACE Awards

Central Ohio Film Critics Association Awards

Chicago Film Critics Association Awards

Critics' Choice Movie Awards

Critics' Choice Television Awards

Dallas-Fort Worth Film Critics Association Awards

Detroit Film Critics Society Awards

Directors Guild of America Awards

Drama Desk Awards

Giffoni International Film Festival Awards

Golden Raspberry Awards

Hollywood Walk of Fame

Las Vegas Film Critics Society Awards

Los Angeles Film Critics Association Awards

National Board of Review

National Society of Film Critics Awards

New York Film Critics Circle Awards

Obie Awards

Online Film & Television Association Awards

Online Film Critics Society Awards

Palm Springs International Film Festival Awards

People's Choice Awards

Phoenix Film Critics Society Awards

Prism Awards

San Diego Film Critics Society Awards

Satellite Awards

Saturn Awards

Southeastern Film Critics Association Awards

Tony Awards

Toronto Film Critics Association Awards

Utah Film Critics Association Awards

Vancouver Film Critics Circle Awards

Washington D.C. Area Film Critics Association Awards

Women in Film and Television International Awards

See also
Kathy Bates filmography

Notes

References
General

Specific

External links
 
 
 

Lists of awards received by American actor